Enocent Mkhabela (born 30 April 1989 in Nelspruit, Mpumalanga) is a South African football (soccer) player who plays as a midfielder for Highlands Park.

Mkhabela made his debut in the PSL for Platinum Stars in 2011, before joining Supersport United in 2013. He joined Kaizer Chiefs in 2016 but returned to Platinum Stars on loan for the 2016/17 season, where he will work under his former coach Cavin Johnson.

References

External links

1989 births
Living people
People from Mbombela
South African soccer players
Association football midfielders
SuperSport United F.C. players
Platinum Stars F.C. players
Sivutsa Stars F.C. players
Kaizer Chiefs F.C. players
Highlands Park F.C. players